Mood may refer to:

Mood (psychology), a relatively long lasting emotional state

Music 
The Mood, a British pop band from 1981 to 1984
Mood (band), hip hop artists
Mood (Jacquees album), 2016
Moods (Barbara Mandrell album), 1978
Moods (Mal Waldron album), 1978
Moods (Neil Diamond album), 1972
Moods (The Three Sounds album), 1960
Moods (Monday Michiru album), 2003
The Mood (EP), a 2013 EP by F.T. Island
"Mood", a song by Lil Uzi Vert, 2018
"Mood", a song by Rita Ora featuring Khea from Bang, 2021
"Mood" (song), a song by 24kGoldn featuring Iann Dior, 2020
Mood, an album by Nayt, 2020

Places 
Mood (city), a city in Iran
Mood, Leh, a village in Ladakh, India
Mood District, a district in Iran
MOOD Designer Fabrics, a store in New York City frequented by contestants of Project Runway

Other uses
Mood (TV series), 2022 British drama
Grammatical mood, one of a set of morphologically distinctive forms that are used to signal modality
Mood (literature), the affective setting of a piece of literature
Robert Mood (born 1958), a Norwegian general

See also
 Mood Indigo (disambiguation)
 Mood music (disambiguation)
 Mood Muzik (disambiguation)
 Mood Ring (disambiguation)
 Mood Swings (disambiguation)